Sports18 Network also known as Sports 18 is a group of Indian multinational pay television sports channels owned by Viacom18, a joint venture between Network 18 and Paramount Global. Launched on 15 April 2022, the channel currently holds rights of flagship tournaments like 2022 FIFA World Cup, ATP Tour Masters 1000, BWF World Championships etc.

History

Viacom18 had been broadcasting Serie A and La Liga, but they did not have a sports channel. So, for the time being, it was digitally available in addition to broadcasts on MTV India. Finally, Sports18 1 and Sports18 1 HD were launched on 15 April, 2022, while Sports18 Khel was launched on 25 April, 2022. Sports18 2 will also be launched along with its HD feed.

Owned channels

Programming

Badminton
BWF World Championships
BWF World Tour

Basketball
NBA

Cricket 

 SA20
 Women's Premier League (cricket):-(2023-2027)
 Abu Dhabi T10
 Road Safety World Series
 International Cricket In South Africa:-(2024-2031)

Football
2022 FIFA World Cup
La Liga
Serie A
Ligue 1
Carabao Cup(2021-22)
Scottish Premiership
Durand Cup
2023 FIFA Women's World Cup
2023 FIFA U-20 World Cup
2023 FIFA U-17 World Cup

Tennis
ATP Tour Masters 1000

Source:

See also
Viacom18
TV18
Network dadd18

References

External links

Cable television in India
Sports television networks in India
English-language television stations in India
Viacom 18
Television channels and stations established in 2022
2022 establishments in India